The Bahamas national under-18 basketball team is a national basketball team of the Bahamas, managed by the Bahamas Basketball Federation.

It represents the country in international under-18 (under age 18) basketball competitions.

See also
Bahamas men's national basketball team
Bahamas men's national under-17 basketball team
Bahamas women's national under-18 basketball team

References

External links
Bahamas Basketball Records at FIBA Archive

Bahamas national basketball team
Men's national under-18 basketball teams